Modern Family is an American television mockumentary sitcom created by Christopher Lloyd and Steven Levitan for ABC. The series is set in Los Angeles and follows the family lives of Jay Pritchett (Ed O'Neill), his daughter Claire Dunphy (Julie Bowen), and his son Mitchell Pritchett (Jesse Tyler Ferguson). Claire and her husband Phil Dunphy (Ty Burrell) have three children: Haley (Sarah Hyland), Alex (Ariel Winter) and Luke (Nolan Gould). Jay has remarried to a much younger Colombian woman, Gloria Delgado-Pritchett (Sofía Vergara), and is helping her raise her son, Manny Delgado (Rico Rodriguez). In season 4, Gloria gives birth to Fulgencio "Joe" Pritchett (Jeremy Maguire). Mitchell and his husband Cameron Tucker (Eric Stonestreet) have adopted a Vietnamese child, Lily Tucker-Pritchett (Aubrey Anderson-Emmons).

Series overview

Episodes

Season 1 (2009–10)

Season 2 (2010–11)

Season 3 (2011–12)

Season 4 (2012–13)

Season 5 (2013–14)

Season 6 (2014–15)

Season 7 (2015–16)

Season 8 (2016–17)

Season 9 (2017–18)

Season 10 (2018–19)

Season 11 (2019–20)

Special (2020)

Ratings

References

External links
 
 

 
Lists of American sitcom episodes